Scott Kenneth Chipperfield (born 30 December 1975) is an Australian former soccer player who played as a midfielder for Wollongong Wolves, FC Basel, FC Aesch and Australia. His 2010 FIFA World Cup profile describes him "as a talented attacker with great physical ability and an eye for goal." He is also known for his versatility in playing in both right and left midfield and as a left sided defender.

Personal life
Chipperfield was born to Kenneth and Dale Chipperfield in Wollongong, New South Wales. He is of English descent and holds dual Australian-Swiss citizenship, having lived in Switzerland since signing for FC Basel in 2001. He has said that he would be willing to return to Wollongong to play in the future, should a bid to gain a Wollongong based team in the A-League be successful. As a boy, Chipperfield supported Liverpool. During his playing days at Wollongong he worked as a school bus driver part-time. His son, Liam is also a professional footballer who plays for the Swiss club Basel.

Club career
Chipperfield began playing soccer at the age of six with Bellambi. In 1993, he started his senior career, winning the Illawarra First Division grand final with Tarrawanna in his only year at the club. He joined Fernhill in the Illawarra Premier League in 1994. After two seasons at Fernhill, Chipperfield joined Illawarra Lions for one season in the NSW Super League.

Wollongong Wolves
Chipperfield began his professional career at Wollongong Wolves in 1996 and was a vital member of the team that won the National Soccer League twice in a row, in 2000 and 2001, and the Oceania Club Championship in 2001. He scored the winning goal in the final of the Oceania Club Championship, as Wollongong Wolves defeated Tafea of Vanuatu 1–0. He twice won the Johnny Warren Medal for the most outstanding player in the Australian domestic season and gained interest from European clubs. He had an unsuccessful trial at English First Division side Bolton Wanderers in the winter of 2000.

In early June 2001, Perth Glory announced that Chipperfield would be joining them for the 2001–02 NSL season, however he signed for FC Basel before his Wollongong Wolves contract expired at the end of the month.

FC Basel
In the summer of 2001 Chipperfield joined Swiss Super League club FC Basel. He helped Basel win the league title (their first in 22 years) and the Swiss Cup in his first season in Switzerland. The following season, he was an important member of the team as Basel reached the Second Group Stage of the 2002–03 UEFA Champions League, notching up wins against MŠK Žilina, Celtic, Spartak Moscow, Deportivo de La Coruña and Juventus on the way. In 2003, he won his second gold medal in the Swiss Cup. In the 2004 and 2005 seasons he won his second and third League Championship titles with the club.

In the summer of 2006, Chipperfield was subject to an unsuccessful bid by Charlton Athletic to obtain his services, but Basel soon announced that he had signed a three-year contract extension. At the end of this season Chipperfield played in the Cup Final in the Stade de Suisse and he received his third Cup Medal as Basel beat FC Luzern 1–0.

Chipperfield won the national Double for the second time in 2008, it was his fourth Cup title and his fourth League title. As Basel qualified for the UEFA Champions League, after a six-year absence, in 2008, Chipperfield was one of only three survivors of the squad that competed in the competition in 2003, the other two being Ivan Ergić and Benjamin Huggel. On 13 September 2008, he came on as a substitute for Orhan Mustafi during Basel's 2–0 defeat of FC Luzern at St. Jakob-Park, to make his 200th league appearance for Basel. He also scored the second goal of the match. In January 2009, he was set to sign for Hertha BSC of the German Bundesliga, but the move fell through on the advice of medical staff.

At the end of the 2009–10 season and 2009–10 Cup campaign Chipperfield achieved his third Double with the club. In April 2011 the club announced a further one-year contract extension. To that date  he had played 367 competition games for the club, scoring 83 goals. At the end of the 2010–11 season Chipperfield won his sixth League Championship title.

In the 2011–12 FC Basel season Chipperfield suffered injuries and therefore only played five games in the League season 2011–12 and three in the Swiss Cup 2011–12, scoring his only goal of the season in the first round away tie against FC Eschenbach on 17 September. Chipperfields last game was in the 1:1 away draw on 11 December 2011 against Neuchâtel Xamax. At the end of the 2011–12 season he won his fourth Double, the League Championship title and the Swiss Cup with Basel.

On 18 May 2012 FC Basel announced on their homepage that the contract with Chipperfield would not be extended. At the end of their 2011–12 season Chipperfield retired from his professional career and moved to local amateur club FC Aesch as player-coach. Between the years 2001 and 2012 Chipperfield played a total of 486 games for the club scoring 106 times. 270 of these games were in the domestic league, 37 in the Cup, 78 in the European competitions and 101 were friendly games. He scored 69 goals in the domestic league, 8 in the cup, 8 in the European competitions and the other 21 were netted during the test games. He is the Basel all-time record holder of titles with the club, with seven Swiss Nationalliga A/Super League and six Swiss Cup honours.

FC Aesch
On 1 June 2012 it was announced he had signed a short-term contract to play for Illawarra Premier League club Tarrawanna Blueys FC. Nevertheless, after a few weeks a move to the Swiss club FC Aesch was revealed by various media and confirmed.

International career
Chipperfield played his debut game for the Australia national team in the Suncorp Stadium, Brisbane as a substitute during the 3–1 win against Fiji on 25 September in the 1998 Oceania Nations Cup. He scored his first goal for the national team in the game against the Cook Islands just three days later, it was the eleventh goal of the game as Australia won 16–0.

He is perhaps best known in Australia for his loyal and somewhat unexpected appearance at the 2002 OFC Nations Cup in New Zealand, a tournament which was marred by the financial turmoil of the then Soccer Australia. The non-existent financial contribution meant that the Australian players had to pay their own way to get to New Zealand. Chipperfield became the only one of Australia's large Europe-based contingent to answer the call and perform for his country in their time of need.

Chipperfield was part of the team that defeated Uruguay in a playoff in November 2005 to qualify for the 2006 FIFA World Cup in Germany, and was named in Australia's final 23-man squad. At the tournament, Chipperfield played an integral role in the Australian midfield and defence; he was considered to be one of Australia's best players. 

On 12 October 2009, Chipperfield announced his intention to retire from the national team immediately after the 2010 FIFA World Cup. After the final group game of the 2010 FIFA World Cup against Serbia, which Australia won 2–1, Chipperfield announced his retirement from international football.

Career statistics

Club

International 

Scores and results list Australia's goal tally first, score column indicates score after each Chipperfield goal.

Honours 
Wollongong Wolves
National Soccer League: 1999–2000, 2000–01
Oceania Club Championship: 2000–01

Basel
Swiss Super League: 2001–02, 2003–04, 2004–05, 2007–08, 2009–10, 2010–11, 2011–12
Swiss Cup: 2001–02, 2002–03, 2006–07, 2007–08, 2009–10, 2011–12

Australia 
 OFC Nations Cup: 2000

Individual 
 Johnny Warren Medal: 1999–2000, 2000–01
 Joe Marston Medal: 2000
 FC Basel Player of the Season: 2003–04, 2009–10
 Football Federation Australia Hall of Fame: 2012

References

External links

 Oz Football profile 
 
 Profile at FC Basel 
 Profile at Swiss Football League Website 
 
 Then Scott Chipperfield Went Bald Swiss Football Blog

1975 births
Living people
Soccer players from Sydney
Sportspeople from Wollongong
Australian soccer players
Australia international soccer players
Australian people of English descent
FC Basel players
Wollongong Wolves FC players
Australian expatriate soccer players
Expatriate footballers in Switzerland
Australian emigrants to Switzerland
Naturalised citizens of Switzerland
1998 OFC Nations Cup players
2000 OFC Nations Cup players
2001 FIFA Confederations Cup players
2002 OFC Nations Cup players
2004 OFC Nations Cup players
2005 FIFA Confederations Cup players
2006 FIFA World Cup players
2010 FIFA World Cup players
Swiss Super League players
National Soccer League (Australia) players
Association football midfielders
Wollongong United FC players